No Cause for Alarm was the first album released by Violinski. It became a minor hit on the albums chart, and it contained their only hit single—"Clog Dance", it reached number 17 on the UK singles chart. Another single from the album, "Save Me", failed to chart. The album was re-released in the U.S. under the name Whirling Dervish in 1982. The cover photography was by Fin Costello.

Track listing

Personnel
According to the back cover.
Violinski
Mike de Albuquerque, Baz Dunnery – guitar, vocals
Paul Mann, Andy Brown – bass guitar, vocals
Mik Kaminski – violin
John Marcangelo – keyboards
John Hodgson – drums, percussion
Additional personnel
Jeff Calvert – engineer (Marquee Studios)
Rafe McKenna – engineer (De Lane Lea Studios)
Mack – engineer (Musicland Studios)
Fin Costello – photography
Martin Poole – art direction

Charts

References

1979 debut albums
Violinski albums
Jet Records albums